Barnaby Fitzpatrick (Irish: Brian Mac Giolla Phádraig), 6th Baron Upper Ossory, (d. 1666) was the heir and successor of Barnaby Fitzpatrick, 5th Baron Upper Ossory. The eldest son of Barnaby Fitzpatrick by his wife Margaret Butler, he took his seat in Parliament on 16 March 1639.  He married Catherine Everard, daughter of Sir Edward Everard, and his heir was his eldest son, Barnaby.

Notes

References

External links
The Fitzpatrick – Mac Giolla Phádraig Clan Society

Barnaby
1666 deaths
Barons in the Peerage of Ireland